Wanda Thomas Bernard  (born August 1, 1953) is a Canadian senator. Wanda excelled at school, and enrolled at Mount Saint Vincent University. However, she would “flunk out” later. She was  formerly a social worker and educator from East Preston, Nova Scotia. Bernard is the first Black Canadian to have an academic tenure position and become a full professor at Dalhousie University, where her research focuses on anti-oppression and diversity. Bernard was one of the founding members of the Association of Black Social Workers. In 2005, she was appointed to the Order of Canada for her work addressing racism and diversity in the field of social work, and in 2014, she was awarded the Order of Nova Scotia. On October 27, 2016, Bernard was named to the Senate of Canada by Prime Minister Justin Trudeau to sit as an independent. At the time of her appointment, she was the chair of the Nova Scotia Advisory Council on the Status of Women. She is the first African Nova Scotian woman to serve in the Senate Chamber.

Bernard supports official recognition of Emancipation Day in Canada, and proposed a 2018 private member's bill to that effect.

Bernard joined the Progressive Senate Group on July 8, 2020.

References

External links

1953 births
Living people
Canadian senators from Nova Scotia
Canadian social work academics
Academic staff of the Dalhousie University
Black Canadian politicians
Black Canadian women
Black Nova Scotians
Independent Senators Group
Women members of the Senate of Canada
21st-century Canadian politicians
21st-century Canadian women politicians
Members of the Order of Canada
Members of the Order of Nova Scotia